Donnie Loftis (born September 7, 1956) is an American politician who has served in the North Carolina House of Representatives since November 2021. A member of the Republican Party, he represents the 109th district, which contains part of Gaston County.

Loftis previously served as chair of the Gaston County board of commissioners and as chair of the board of directors of CaroMont Health. He resigned the latter position on May 4, 2020, in the midst of the COVID-19 pandemic in North Carolina, after spreading COVID-19 misinformation and posting on his personal Facebook page that Gov. Roy Cooper's stay-at-home order amounted to "tyranny".

Loftis was also present at the U.S. Capitol riot on January 6, 2021. He wrote on social media on January 6 that he "got gassed three times and was at the entrance when they breached the door". When asked by a reporter in October 2021 about his involvement, he claimed that he "had absolutely zero involvement in the rioting and categorically condemn the storming of our Capitol building that day".

Early life and career

Gaston County board of commissioners

CaroMont Health

North Carolina House of Representatives (2021–present)

Loftis previously ran for the 109th district seat in the North Carolina House of Representatives in 2012. In the four-candidate Republican primary won by Dana Bumgardner, he placed fourth with 19.1% of the vote.

Appointment
After Rep. Bumgardner died in office on October 2, 2021, from liver cancer, the county Republican Party convened to recommend a candidate to replace him. The governor, Roy Cooper, was then required to appoint this candidate to the North Carolina House of Representatives within seven days. Loftis defeated county commissioner Ronnie Worley and Bumgardner's daughter Lauren Bumgardner Current to win the party endorsement on October 21.

Loftis was sworn in on November 1, 2021. His seating led to a walk-out by House Democrats to protest his involvement in the U.S. Capitol riot. Bobbie Richardson, chair of the North Carolina Democratic Party, said in a statement that "today marks a new low for General Assembly Republicans, because instead of condemning those actions and rejecting the rhetoric that incites violence, they are welcoming a Capitol insurrection participant with open arms".

Committee assignments

2021-2022 session
Appropriations
Appropriations - Transportation
Health
Homeland Security, Military, and Veterans Affairs
Local Government
Transportation

Electoral history

2022

2012

2008

2004

References

External links
Official House website

1956 births
Living people
People from Gastonia, North Carolina
21st-century American politicians
County commissioners in North Carolina
Republican Party members of the North Carolina House of Representatives